Shathashrunga is a mountain range in the Kolar district, Karnataka state (southeastern portion) India that meets the Eastern Ghats.  The Antara Gange comes within this range of mountains.

References

BANGALORE: What started under a leaking shed with a few ailing, old men and women and six hearing impaired children, has now blossomed into a four-acre-land with innovative facilities amidst fresh air. This land lying approximately 35 kilometres south of Bangalore city is called ‘Sai Vrindavan campus’ run by the Sri Shathashrunga Vidya Samasthe. This is a home for the mentally challenged elderly destitute as well as a school for hearing impaired children. One of the specialty of this campus is that there is no fencing. The organisation was founded in 1988 by BR Ramprasad and his wife Nagavenamma exclusively for the hearing impaired children. The inspiration behind the organisation was their own who was born with hearing impairment. Ramprasad who was then an employee of BEML started the school with the help of deaf parents and four students. “ We were always on the lookout for better treatment for our son and that is when the doctor suggested that we should start one of our own with better facilities,” said Ramprasad. The school for the deaf lays emphasis on practical learning through ‘Material Reflective Method’ rather than sign language. The campus has classes from standard 1 to 10 for both girls and boys through which they are given vocational training. The students stay at the hostels provided by the organisation and it is a world they can easily relate to. “The students like staying here, their peer group is like any other but here, they are accepted and understood better,” said a teacher from the school. The organisation is also an asylum for the old who are mostly abandoned by their own children. The Sai Snehadhama Vrudhashrama (Home for senior Citizens), currently has 100 aged destitute who are suffering from problems like mental retardation and Alzheimer. The organisation provides them with basic facilities along with medical care and entertainment. “For these homeless elderly, the founder and his wife are godlike. They address them as ‘appa’ and ‘amma’,” says R Sudha, Principal, Sri Shathashrugna Residential School for the Deaf.“Not sympathy, it is opportunity that they want and unfortunately our society is not quite ready to provide,” said Ramaprasad and added, “There are two challenges ahead of him, the first one, is to discourage marriage between two deaf people as it might be an easy way out for them but not the right atmosphere for a child to grow up. The second is the growing gap between parents and children.”

Mountains of Karnataka
Geography of Kolar district